George Coe was an American politician. He served as the mayor of Lancaster, Pennsylvania from 1962 to 1966. As mayor he pushed for demolition of a large number of buildings in downtown Lancaster to facilitate redevelopment.

References

Mayors of Lancaster, Pennsylvania
Year of birth missing